Vega (or , or , meaning "Advanced generation European carrier rocket") is an expendable launch system in use by Arianespace jointly developed by the Italian Space Agency (ASI) and the European Space Agency (ESA). Development began in 1998 and the first launch took place from the Centre Spatial Guyanais on 13 February 2012.

It is designed to launch small payloads – 300 to 2500 kg satellites for scientific and Earth observation missions to polar and low Earth orbits. The reference Vega mission is a polar orbit bringing a spacecraft of 1500 kg to an altitude of 700 km.

The rocket, named after Vega, the brightest star in the constellation Lyra, is a single-body launcher (no strap-on boosters) with three solid rocket stages: the P80 first stage, the Zefiro 23 second stage, and the Zefiro 9 third stage. The upper module is a liquid rocket called AVUM. The improved version of the P80 stage, the P120C, will also be used as the side boosters of the Ariane 6. Italy is the leading contributor to the Vega program (65%), followed by France (13%). Other participants include Spain, Belgium, the Netherlands, Switzerland and Sweden.

Development

Background 
During the mid-1990s, French firms Aérospatiale and SEP, along with Italian firm Bombrini-Parodi-Delfino (BPD), commenced discussions on the development of a proposed Ariane Complementary Launcher (ACL). Around the same time, Italy began to champion the concept of a new solid-propellant satellite launcher. This proposed launcher, dubbed Vega, was promoted as functioning to expand the range of European launch capabilities; Vega would be capable of launching a 1000 kg payload into a 700 km polar orbit. From the onset, the first of three stages would be based on the solid booster of the existing Ariane 5 expendable launch system while the second and third stages would make use of the in-development Zefiro rocket motor.

However, it was recognised to be a costly project and thus difficult for Italy alone to finance; accordingly, international partners were sought early on in order to proceed with development. In April 1998, it was publicly stated that the Vega programme was dependent upon the securing of roughly ECU70 million of industrial investment, as well as the availability of around ECU350 million of funding that had been requested from interested member states of the European Space Agency (ESA), led by France and Italy. During June 1998, it was announced that ministers from European Space Agency (ESA) member states had agreed to proceed with the first phase of the development programme for Vega; the participating members were France, Belgium, the Netherlands, Spain and Italy – the latter had assumed 55% of the burden for financing the programme.

By September 1998, it was projected that, if fully funded, Vega would perform its first launch during 2002. However, by early 1998, France was publicly showing displeasure in the programme, leading to disputes in its funding. A new, higher-performance version of the Vega was proposed, but this failed to sufficiently satisfy France. In September 1999, France decided to withdraw from the Vega programme entirely, leading to fears for the future of the launcher. In November 1999, European Space Agency (ESA) formally dropped Vega as an endorsed programme, a decision which was largely attributed to France's withdrawal; Italy declared that it would proceed regardless, and threatened to re-direct its allocated contributions for the further development of the Ariane 5 to meet the shortfall.

Around 2000, an alternative use for the Vega was explored as a medium-class booster rocket to be used in conjunction with an improved, up-rated model of the Ariane 5 heavy launcher. In October 2000, it was announced that France and Italy had settled their year-long dispute over the Vega programme; France and Italy agreed to provide 35% and 52%, respectively, of the financing towards the all-composite P80 booster for the Ariane 5 — work which would be included in the Vega programme. In March 2001, FiatAvio and the Italian Space Agency (ASI) formed a new company, European Launch Vehicle (ELV), to assume responsibility for the majority of development work on the Vega programme. By 2003, there was concerns that European Space Agency (ESA)'s recent adoption of the Russian Soyuz launcher would directly compete with the in-development Vega; demands for such launchers had declined with a downturn in the mobile telecommunications satellite market and doubts over the European Galileo satellite navigation system.

Programme launch 
In March 2003, contracts for development of the Vega launcher were signed by European Space Agency (ESA) and Centre national d'études spatiales (CNES), the French space agency; Italy provided 65% of funding while six additional nations contributed the remainder. In May 2004, it was reported that a contract was signed between commercial operator Arianespace and prime contractor ELV to perform vehicle integration at Kourou, French Guiana. In November 2004, construction commenced upon a new dedicated launch pad for the Vega launcher at Kourou, this included a bunker and a self-propelled structure to assist assembly of the stages; this site was built over the original launch pad for the retired Ariane 1 launcher. In September 2005, the successful completion of key tests on the Vega's solid rocket motor igniters, a key milestone, was reported.

In November 2005, European Space Agency (ESA) declared its desire for the development and deployment of an electric propulsion-powered module to work in conjunction with the Vega launcher; this envisioned module would transfer payloads between low Earth orbit (LEO) and a geostationary orbit (GEO). During November 2005, it was reported that both Israel and India had shown formal interest in the Vega programme. In December 2005, the Vega launcher, along with the Ariane and Soyuz launchers, were endorsed as the recognised "first choice" platforms for ESA payloads. On 19 December 2005, the first test firing of the Vega's third stage was completed successfully at Salto di Quirra, Sardinia. For several years, further tests would be conducted at the Sardinia site. Progress on Vega was delayed by the failure of one such test of the third stage on 28 March 2007.

During January 2007, European Space Agency (ESA) announced that the agency was studying the use of Global Positioning System (GPS) navigation in order to support launches of the Vega and Ariane. At the 2009 Paris Air Show, it was revealed that the adoption of more cost-effective engine to replace the upper stages of the Vega have been postponed due to a failure to reduce the overall costs of the launcher, making it much less worthwhile to pursue. Despite this finding, efforts to improve the efficiency of the third stage continued. At this point, the certification of all four stages of the Vega launch was anticipated to be achieved prior to the end of 2009, while the first launch was scheduled to take place during 2010. The first flight was intended to be flown with a scientific payload, rather than a "dummy" placeholder; but had intentionally avoided a costly commercial satellite. By late 2010, the first flight had been delayed into 2011.

Into flight 
During October 2011, all major components of the first Vega rocket departed Avio's Colleferro facility, near Rome, by sea for Kourou. At this point, the first launch was anticipated to occur during December 2011 or January 2012. During early January 2012, it was reported that the launch date would slip into the following month. On 13 February 2012, the first launch of the Vega rocket occurred for Kourou; it was reported as being an "apparently perfect flight".

During mid-2011, it was postulated that an evolved 'Europeanised' upgrade of the Vega rocket could be developed in the medium-to-long term future. Following the successful first launch, various improvements for the Vega were postulated. The German Aerospace Center (DLR) was reportedly enthusiastic on the prospects of developing a European alternative to the Vega's final, fourth stage; however, it was widely believed that there should be no change to Vega hardware for roughly 10 years in order to consolidate operations and avoid unnecessary costs early on. European Space Agency (ESA) was also keen to take advantage of potential commonalities between the Vega and the proposed Ariane 6 heavy launcher.

Following on from the first launch, a further four flights were conducted under the vestiges of the VERTA programme (Vega Research and Technology Accompaniment), during which observation or scientific payloads were orbited while validating and readying the Vega rocket for more lucrative commercial operations. The second launch, performed on 6 May 2013, which followed a considerably more demanding flight profile and carried the type's first commercial payload, was also successful. In the aftermath of this second launch, European Space Agency (ESA) declared the Vega rocket to be "fully functional". The lapse of more than one year between the inaugural flight and the second one was mainly due to the fact that the Italian manufacturer had to completely redevelop the Flight Control Software, due to the restrictions on French export control imposed on the software used on the first flight.

Since entering commercial service, Arianespace markets Vega as a launch system tailored for missions to polar and sun-synchronous orbits. During its qualification flight, Vega placed its main payload of 386.8 kg, the LARES satellite, into a circular orbit at the altitude of 1450 km with an inclination of 69.5°.

Specifications

Stages

Payload 

The payload fairing of the Vega was designed and is manufactured by RUAG Space of Switzerland. It has a diameter of 2.6 metres, a height of 7.8 metres and a mass of 400 kg.

Three solid motor stages 
The first three stages are solid propellant engines produced by Avio, that is prime contractor for the Vega launcher through its company ELV.

, the design and production process of the three engine types intended for the three stages of Vega were planned to be verified in two ground-test firings — one for design evaluation and one in the final flight configuration.

P80 

The P80 is the first stage of VEGA, its name is derived from the design phase propellant weight of 80 tons that was later increased to 88 tons. The P80 includes a thrust vector control (TVC) system, developed and made in Belgium by SABCA, consisting of two electromechanical actuators that operate a movable nozzle with flexible joint using lithium ion batteries. The 3 m diameter case is composed of graphite epoxy filament wound case and low density rubber is used for the internal insulation. The nozzle is made of light low-cost carbon phenolic material; a consumable casing is used for the igniter. The solid propellant loaded has low binder content and high aluminium percentage (HTPB 1912).

The first test firing of the P80 engine took place on 30 November 2006 in Kourou, and the test was concluded successfully.

The second test firing of the P80 first stage engine took place on 4 December 2007 in Kourou. Delivering a mean thrust of 190 tonnes over 111 seconds, the engine's behaviour was in line with predictions.

The future version of the stage, P120C, also with its name derived from the design phase propellant weight of 120 tons, will increase the propellant mass to 141–143 tons.

Zefiro 23 

The development of the Zefiro motor was initiated by Avio, partially funded by the company and partially funded by a contract from the Italian Space Agency (ISA). A Zefiro 23 forms the second stage of Vega. Its carbon-epoxy case is filament-wound and its carbon phenolic nozzle includes a carbon-carbon throat insert. The propellant loading is 23 tons.

The Zefiro 23 second stage engine was first fired on 26 June 2006 at Salto di Quirra. This test was successful.

The second test firing of the Zefiro 23 second stage engine took place on 27 March 2008 also at Salto di Quirra. This successful test qualified the rocket engine.

Zefiro 9 

The first engine completed was Zefiro 9, the third stage engine. The first test firing was carried out on 20 December 2005, at the Salto di Quirra Inter-force Test Range, on the Mediterranean coast in southeast Sardinia. The test was a complete success.

After a critical design review based on the completed first test firings, the second test-firing of the Zefiro 9 took place at Salto di Quirra on 28 March 2007. After 35 seconds, there was a sudden drop in the motor's internal pressure, leading to an increased combustion time. No public information is available for this sudden drop of internal pressure, and whether any flaws were present in the motor's design.

On 23 October 2008, an enhanced version of the Zefiro 9 with a modified nozzle design, the Zefiro 9-A, was successfully tested.

On 28 April 2009, the final qualification test firing of Zefiro 9-A took place at the Salto di Quirra Interforce Test Range in Sardinia, Italy.

Attitude Vernier Upper Module (AVUM) 

The Attitude Vernier Upper Module (AVUM) upper stage, developed by Avio, has been designed to place the payload in the required orbit and to perform roll and attitude control functions. The AVUM consists of two modules: AVUM Propulsion Module (APM) and AVUM Avionics Module (AAM). The propulsion module uses a Ukrainian-built RD-843 (RD-868P) rocket engine liquid-fuel rocket burning pressure-fed UDMH and nitrogen tetroxide as propellants. The AVUM avionics module contains the main components of the avionics sub-system of the vehicle.

Variants 
There was a concept study for a new medium-size launcher based on Vega and Ariane 5 elements. This launcher would use an Ariane 5 P230 first stage, a Vega P80 second stage and an Ariane 5 third stage using either storable or cryogenic fuel.

The future upgraded Vega (LYRA program) has exceeded the feasibility study and is planned to replace the current third and fourth stages with a single low cost LOX/Liquid methane stage with a new guidance system. The purpose of the program is to upgrade the performance by about 30% without significant price increase.

On 14 February 2012, one day after the successful first launch of Vega, the German Aerospace Center (DLR) moved to be included in the program. Johann-Dietrich Wörner, at that time head of DLR, said Germany wanted to join the project. Germany would provide a replacement for the RD-843 engine on the AVUM fourth stage, currently made in Ukraine. The Vega launcher manager stated that it will not fly in the near future because it takes some time to develop, but he confirmed it will be on agenda in the next meeting of ministers in late 2012. That way, all components of the rocket would be built inside the European Union (EU), excluding the Swiss made ones.

The revised Vega-C first stage, renamed P120C (Common), has been selected as booster for the first stage of the next generation Ariane 6 rocket at European Space Agency (ESA) Council meeting at Ministerial level in December 2014.

Avio is also considering a "Vega Light" that would omit the first stage of either the Vega-C or Vega-E and would be targeted at replenishing satellite constellations. The vehicle would be capable of launching between 250–300 kg or 400–500 kg depending on whether it was derived from a Vega-C or Vega-E, respectively.

Vega-C 

Vega-C (or Vega Consolidation) is an evolution on the original Vega launcher to enable better launch performance and flexibility. Development started following the December 2014 ESA Ministerial Council with the goal to meet the change in payload demands, both in regards to an increase in medium-sized institutional payloads, and to compete with cheaper launch providers.

This new evolution incorporates various changes to the Vega stack, the first stage P80 motor will be replaced with the P120C, the same booster due to be used on the upcoming Ariane 6 launcher, and the Zefiro 23 second stage will also be replaced with the Zefiro 40. The larger AVUM+ will replace the AVUM fourth stage, while the third Zefiro 9 stage will be carried over from the base version of the launcher.

These modifications will enable new mission parameters using various payload adapters and upper stages. The new rocket will be able to carry dual payloads using the Vespa-C payload adapter, or a single large satellite in addition to smaller payloads using the Vampire and SMSS multiple payload dispenser. Orbital transfer capability is also available with the Vega Electrical Nudge Upper Stage, or VENUS.

Return missions are also available with the use of the reusable Space Rider vehicle, currently in development by ESA, and due to launch on a Vega-C in 2023.

On 13 July 2022, Vega-C had its debut flight during which it delivered the LARES 2 and six other satellites to orbit. This launch came as a way of filling the gap after the Russian rockets became unavailable due to the war in Ukraine. On 21 December 2022 (UTC), Vega-C suffered a launch failure due to an anomaly with the Zefiro 40 second stage resulting in the loss of two spacecraft for the Airbus Pléiades Neo Earth-imaging constellation.

Vega-E 
Building on Vega-C, Vega-E (or Vega Evolution) is a further evolution of the Vega-C with the Zefiro 9 and AVUM+ third and fourth stage replaced with a cryogenic upper stage powered by liquid oxygen and liquid methane. This variant offers even more flexibility than Vega-C, with the ability to deliver multiple satellites into different orbits on a single launch.

 Avio is finalizing the development of the new M10 methane engine used in the new upper stage. The engine design is the result of a collaboration between Avio and Chemical Automatics Design Bureau (KBKhA) ended in 2014.

Avio successfully conducted the first series of tesing of the M10 engine between May and July 2022 with the maiden flight of the Vega-E planned for 2026.

Launch statistics

Launch history

Future launches

Costs 
Development costs for the Vega rocket totaled €710 million, with ESA spending an additional €400 million to sponsor five development flights between 2012 and 2014. Estimates of commercial launch costs in 2012 were projected to be €32 million, including Arianespace's marketing and service costs, or €25 million for each rocket alone, assuming a launch rate of 2 per year. In 2012, it was estimated that if the sustained flight rate were to increase to four flights per year, the price of each individual launch vehicle could potentially decrease to €22 million. In the event, by November 2020, Vega had never flown more than three flights in a single year, with an average flight rate of just under two launches per year.

Comparable rockets 
 Delta II 7420 (retired)
 Epsilon
 Firefly Alpha
 Minotaur IV
 Minotaur-C
 Rokot (retired)
 Soyuz-2-1v
 Polar Satellite Launch Vehicle
 List of Vega launches

See also 

 List of Vega launches
 Solid rocket
 P120 (rocket stage)
 Comparison of orbital launchers families
 Comparison of orbital launch systems

Notes

References

External links 

 Vega launcher, European Space Agency
 ELV – European Launch Vehicle s.p.a.
 Vega Launcher, Avio
 First stone for Vega at Europe's Spaceport
 Vega brochure
 Vega Leaflet
 Vega Nozzle
 Telemetry Simulator of VEGA
 
 

 
Space launch vehicles of Europe
Solid-fuel rockets
Italian Space Agency
Vehicles introduced in 2012
Arianespace
Italian inventions